James Frederick Vennings (born 20 November 2000) is an English professional footballer who plays as a midfielder for Bromley.

Career statistics

Honours
Bromley
FA Trophy: 2021–22

References

English footballers
2000 births
Living people
Association football midfielders
Charlton Athletic F.C. players
Aldershot Town F.C. players
Bromley F.C. players
English Football League players
National League (English football) players